Rumbleseat was the acoustic-folk side project of Hot Water Music frontmen Chuck Ragan and Chris Wollard, and Samantha Jones. Formed in 1998, Rumbleseat released four 7" records before releasing the full length album, 'Rumbleseat Is Dead', which was released in 2005.

Rumbleseat is Dead 
Rumbleseat's only full length album, Rumbleseat is Dead, is a collection of songs from their four seven inch singles California Burritos, Picker, Saturn In Crosshairs, and Trestles as well as two songs from compilations, and four previously unreleased songs. The album didn't see its release until July 12, 2005, as the band was faced with delay after delay. One of these delays was a result of the Hurricane Gaston flood of Richmond, Virginia, where numerous recordings were damaged. When the album was finally released it received criticism from fans for not having the popular Walk Through the Darkness. The album also features covers of Johnny Cash and June Carter's Jackson, Don Gibson's Sea of Heartbreak, and Tex Ritter's Rye Whiskey.

Track listing
 California Burritos (2:23)
 Cursing Concrete (3:03)
 Trestles (3:19)
 Picker (3:01)
 Jackson (2:38)
 Restless (5:22)
 Shithouse Rat (2:15)
 Moonshiner (4:35)
 Saturn in Crosshairs (4:23)
 Chattanooga Bend (2:59)
 Sea of Heartbreak (2:41)
 Rye Whiskey (1:57)

Musical groups from Gainesville, Florida
Musical groups established in 1998
1998 establishments in Florida